Tagaturonate reductase is an enzyme that catalyzes the chemical reaction

D-altronate + NAD+  D-tagaturonate + NADH + H+

Thus, the two substrates of this enzyme are D-altronate and NAD+, whereas its 3 products are D-tagaturonate, NADH, and H+.

This enzyme belongs to the family of oxidoreductases, specifically those acting on the CH-OH group of donor with NAD+ or NADP+ as acceptor. The systematic name of this enzyme class is D-altronate:NAD+ 3-oxidoreductase. Other names in common use include altronic oxidoreductase, altronate oxidoreductase, TagUAR, altronate dehydrogenase, and D-tagaturonate reductase. This enzyme participates in pentose and glucuronate interconversions.

References

 

EC 1.1.1
NADH-dependent enzymes
Enzymes of unknown structure